Hirne is an urban-type settlement in Krasnodon Municipality (district) in Luhansk Raion of Luhansk Oblast in eastern Ukraine. Population:

Demographics
Native language distribution as of the Ukrainian Census of 2001:
 Russian: 100%

References

Urban-type settlements in Luhansk Raion